Sandra J. Simpson is a judge currently serving on the Federal Court of Canada.

References

Living people
Judges of the Federal Court of Canada
Canadian women judges
Year of birth missing (living people)